Baby Geniuses is a 1999 American family comedy film directed by Bob Clark and written by Clark and Greg Michael based on a story by Clark, Steven Paul, Francisca Matos, and Robert Grasmere, and starring Kathleen Turner, Christopher Lloyd, Kim Cattrall, Peter MacNicol, and Ruby Dee.

The film has the distinction of being the first full-length feature to use computer-generated imagery for the synthesis of human visual speech. 2D warping techniques were used to digitally animate the mouth viseme shapes of the babies which were originally shot with their mouths closed. The viseme shapes were sampled from syllables uttered by the babies on the set.

The film grossed over $36 million worldwide. In 2004, it was followed by a sequel, Superbabies: Baby Geniuses 2, which was a box office bomb, and received reviews even more critical than the first film, getting nominated for Worst Picture at the 25th Golden Raspberry Awards.

Plot
Two scientists, Dr. Elena Kinder and Dr. Heep use genius-baby studies to fund BabyCo's theme park "Joyworld". According to Dr. Kinder's research on toddlers/babies, babies are born possessing vast, universal knowledge and speak a secret yet impossible-to-translate baby pre-language called Babytalk. However, at age 2–3, the knowledge and language are lost as the babies "cross over" by learning how to speak human languages. All babies raised in Dr. Kinder's underground research facility were adopted from the orphanages Babyco supports (as they serve to filter out which babies should be raised under the Kinder Method and which babies shouldn't be raised under the Kinder Method) and transformed into small geniuses through use of the Kinder Method, and then used in experiments to decipher this secret yet impossible-to-translate language used by the eight baby geniuses.

One mischievous toddler, Sylvester (the only one of her toddlers raised via the use of the superior version of the Kinder Method), nicknamed "Sly", makes repeated attempts to escape Dr. Kinder's research facility. One night, Sylvester goes into a diaper truck and succeeds. The next morning, he is surprised to run into his long-lost normal twin brother, Whit, in a Joyworld playground. Although Sylvester and Whit share a telepathic bond, each has no idea of the other's existence. The guards from Dr. Kinder's research facility capture Whit, mistaking him for Sylvester, and take him back to Dr. Kinder's research facility. Sylvester is taken home by Whit's adopted mother, Robin, who is Dr. Kinder's niece. Dr. Kinder and the seven other baby geniuses are shocked that Whit and Sylvester switched places at the mall, but Dr. Kinder becomes excited and begins to see this as an opportunity to do a cross-evaluation on the twins. However, when she comes to Dan Bobbin's place, she realizes that Dan can understand babies. After the attempts to retrieve Sylvester fail, Dr. Kinder decides to move the research facility to Liechtenstein, and they have no choice but to make Whit the only normal baby to be raised in this research facility until they can find a possible way to get Sylvester back to her research facility.

The babies at Bobbin's place hypnotize Lenny, the bus driver, to drive to Dr. Kinder's research facility. Once at the research facility, Sylvester goes to the control room to set the robots from the theme park on the lab scientists. When the Bobbins return home, their natural daughter Carrie tells her father that the children are in Dr. Kinder's research facility. At the end of the fight, Dr. Kinder captures Whit and takes him to the helicopter pad on the roof. Robin and Dan chase them to the roof, where Dr. Kinder reveals that she and Robin are not related and that Robin was adopted at age 2. After Dr. Kinder is arrested by the police, Sylvester and Whit come together on the roof to cross over.

Dan and Robin adopt Sylvester. Dan is still curious about the secrets of life; but, as the twins have crossed over, they no longer know those secrets. Carrie, their sister, doesn't reveal anything (just giving her father a Sly smile) because adults are never meant to know their secrets.

Cast
 Kathleen Turner as Dr. Elena Kinder
 Christopher Lloyd as Dr. Heep
 Peter MacNicol as Dan Bobbins (the biological father of Carrie and adoptive father of Whit & Sylvester)
 Kim Cattrall as Robin Bobbins, Dan's wife (the biological mother of Carrie and adoptive mother of Whit & Sylvester)
 Dom DeLuise as Lenny, who is a janitor and sitter for Dan and Robin.
 Ruby Dee as Margo, Dan and Robin's housekeeper.
 Kyle Howard as Dickie/Ice Pick, a teenage guru of the group in Dan and Robin's family.
 Kathleen Freeman as Lenny's Noisy Neighbor (uncredited)
 Jim Hanks as Goon Ray 
 Sam McMurray as Goon Bob
 Dan Monahan as Reporter
 Leo, Gerry and Myles Fitzgerald as Sylvester & Whit (Voiced by Miko Hughes)
 Brianna and Brittany McConnell as Lexi (Voiced by Lexi Thomas)
 Gabrielle and Megan Robbins as Carrie Bobbins (Voiced by Aaron Spann & Scarlett Pomers)
 Jacob and Zachary Handy as Ducy (Voiced by Seth Adkins)
 Griffen and Connor Legget as Basil (Voiced by Scotty Leavenworth)
 Amanda & Caitlin Fein as Teddie (Voiced by Ashli Adams)

Production
Director Bob Clark becmae involved with the film in 1994 when he ran into Jon Voight at a play who told Clark of a script his production company, jointly owned by Steven Paul, Crystal Sky Pictures had acquired that centered around intelligent babies. Clark took the script from Voight and expressed to him and Paul that he did not think the premises would work. However Clark changed his mind when Voight and Paul showed him a one minute proof of concept film about  they had done with some babies sitting around a table in a management meeting like they were executives with their mouths morphed to appear as if they were talking. The script Clark read was a much more fanciful fairy tale concept involving babies in a family discovering a hole that leads them to Baby World, inhabited by infants with only a few adults around. Clark eventually rewrote, jettisoning that plot completely in favor of the corporate intrigue angle desiring to go with a more realistic presentation of the concept. Adult actors were tested for the babies' voices, but this idea was quickly rejected with the produces opting for child voice overs.

The film's concept was conceived by producer Steven Paul, who was inspired by a moment in his life when he saw two babies communicating together at a Barneys New York. David Saunders, the then-president of Sony's Triumph Films, wasn't sure that the film could work until he saw the movie Babe, which had similar use of mouth morphing. The studio held auditions for babies in about six cities. Triplet actors Miles, Leo, and Gerry Fitzgerald were almost three when they were cast in the dual role of Wilt and Sly. Jim Wagner, the film's baby wrangler, noted that the actors "still looked like babies. And with triplets, you can work longer hours than you can with twins." The film was shot for 50 days, wrapping in March 1997.

The film faced numerous delays. It was originally planned to be released around Christmas 1997. Due to the incomplete visual effects, the film was postponed to April 10, 1998, then January 29, 1999, and then ultimately March 12, 1999. Baby Geniuses was one of the final films to be produced under Sony's Triumph Films label before it shuttered in 1997. The film was briefly handed off to Columbia TriStar Home Video for a Direct-to-video release, but eventually reverted back to a theatrical release.

Reception
Baby Geniuses received overwhelmingly negative reviews, being panned by critics and audiences alike. Review aggregator Rotten Tomatoes reported that only 2% of critics gave the film a positive review, based on 45 reviews. Its final consensus reads: "Flat direction and actors who look embarrassed to be onscreen make Baby Geniuses worse than the premise suggests." The film received a normalized score of 6 out of 100 on Metacritic based on 14 critics, indicating the reviews as "overwhelming dislike". Audiences polled by CinemaScore gave the film an average grade of "B−" on an A+ to F scale.

Roger Ebert gave the film 1.5 stars out of 4, writing, "Bad films are easy to make, but a film as unpleasant as Baby Geniuses achieves a kind of grandeur. And it proves something I've long suspected: Babies are cute only when they're being babies. When they're presented as miniature adults (on greeting cards, in TV commercials or especially in this movie), there is something so fundamentally wrong that our human instincts cry out in protest."

In a positive review, Dwayne E. Leslie of Box Office Magazine gave the film 3 out of 5 stars. He compared the film to Look Who's Talking, calling it a "step beyond" for its use of computer-animated mouths "instead of using facial gestures to get implied meanings across." The reviewer also labeled the film as "a live action Rugrats cartoon".

Box office
The film made over $5 million in its opening weekend, and was the 10th highest-grossing PG-rated movie of 1999.

Awards and nominations

Sequel and other media

Although the film was not received well by critics, its commercial success on home video prompted a sequel, Superbabies: Baby Geniuses 2. Bob Clark returns to direct the sequel. Jon Voight, who was previously co-executive producer for Baby Geniuses, stars in the film as the antagonist, Bill Biscane. With reception much worse than the original, it was a box office bomb and is widely considered among the worst films of all time.

In 2011, an original series based on the films was announced. The series has so far aired in Italy and the Far East. Additionally, the series was released as a set of movies. Baby Geniuses and the Mystery of the Crown Jewels, which features episodes 1–4, was released direct-to-video in 2013. Episodes 5–8, Baby Geniuses and the Treasures of Egypt, came out in 2014, and episodes 9–12, were released as Baby Geniuses and the Space Baby in 2015. The series follow the Baby Squad Investigators, or B.S.I., as they pursue Big Baby (voiced by Christopher Bones), his father Beauregard Burger (Andy Pandini), and the international thief Moriarty (Jon Voight).

References

External links

 
 
 

1999 films
1990s science fiction comedy films
American children's comedy films
American science fiction comedy films
1990s English-language films
Child superheroes
Films scored by Paul Zaza
Films about babies
Films directed by Bob Clark
TriStar Pictures films
1999 comedy films
1990s American films